James Ross Macdonald (born February 27, 1923) is an American physicist, who was instrumental in building up the Central Research laboratories of Texas Instruments (TI).

Biography
He received a B.A. in physics from Williams College and an S.B. and SM in E.E. from MIT in 1944 and 1947. Oxford awarded him a D.Phil. in 1950 and a D.Sc. degree in 1967.

He joined Texas Instruments in 1953, where he served as Director of the Physics Research laboratory; Director of the Central Research laboratories; Vice President, Corporate Research and Engineering; and as Vice President, Corporate Research and Development.

While at TI, Macdonald published over 175 scientific and engineering papers.

Honors and awards
Macdonald was elected to the National Academy of Engineering in 1970, and to the National Academy of Sciences in 1973. In 1985 he received the George E. Pake Prize of the American Physical Society. He is a Fellow of the Institute of Electrical and Electronics Engineers, was awarded the 1988 IEEE Edison Medal "For seminal contributions to solid state science and technology, and outstanding leadership as a research director."

External links
 Home page

References 

1923 births
Living people
People from Savannah, Georgia
Williams College alumni
Members of the United States National Academy of Sciences
Fellow Members of the IEEE
Members of the United States National Academy of Engineering
IEEE Edison Medal recipients
Texas Instruments people
21st-century American physicists
Fellows of the American Physical Society
Massachusetts Institute of Technology alumni
Alumni of the University of Oxford
American expatriates in the United Kingdom